Edward Charles "Ted" Titchmarsh (June 1, 1899 – January 18, 1963) was a leading British mathematician.

Education
Titchmarsh was educated at King Edward VII School (Sheffield) and Balliol College, Oxford, where he began his studies in October 1917.

Career
Titchmarsh was known for work in analytic number theory, Fourier analysis and other parts of mathematical analysis. He wrote several classic books in these areas; his book on the Riemann zeta-function was reissued in an edition edited by Roger Heath-Brown.

Titchmarsh was Savilian Professor of Geometry at the University of Oxford from 1932 to 1963. He was a Plenary Speaker at the ICM in 1954 in Amsterdam.

He was on the governing body of Abingdon School from 1935-1947.

Awards
Fellow of the Royal Society, 1931
De Morgan Medal, 1953
Sylvester Medal, 1955
Berwick Prize winner, 1956

Publications
The Zeta-Function of Riemann (1930);
Introduction to the Theory of Fourier Integrals (1937) 2nd. edition(1939) 2nd. edition (1948);
The Theory of Functions  (1932);
Mathematics for the General Reader (1948);
The Theory of the Riemann Zeta-Function (1951); 2nd edition, revised by D. R. Heath-Brown (1986)
Eigenfunction Expansions Associated with Second-order Differential Equations. Part I  (1946) 2nd. edition (1962);
Eigenfunction Expansions Associated with Second-order Differential Equations. Part II  (1958);

References

1899 births
1963 deaths
People from Newbury, Berkshire
20th-century British mathematicians
Number theorists
Mathematical analysts
Fellows of the Royal Society
People educated at King Edward VII School, Sheffield
Savilian Professors of Geometry
Alumni of Balliol College, Oxford
Governors of Abingdon School